WQMR-LP is a Classic Hits formatted broadcast radio station licensed to Rocky Mount, Virginia, serving South-Central Franklin County, Virginia and Northeastern Henry County, Virginia.  WQMR-LP is owned and operated by Brameldon Productions.

References

External links
 Q-101.3 Online
 

2014 establishments in Virginia
Classic hits radio stations in the United States
Radio stations established in 2014
QMR-LP
QMR-LP